Moshe Aryeh Friedman (born 1972 in Williamsburg, Brooklyn, New York City), currently living in Antwerp, Belgium, is a practicing Haredi Jew.

When speaking to the media, he introduces himself as "Rabbi Moshe Friedman", but his status as rabbi has been questioned and challenged by the Ashkenazi Chief Rabbi of Israel, Yona Metzger. Friedman opposes Zionism, and therefore does not recognize Rabbi Metzger's authority. Friedman's views are somewhat close to the Satmar Hasidic group, but he is not affiliated with them. Officials of the Austrian Jewish community claim that he has not proven that he has completed the rabbinical studies required to earn the title, and he was actually expelled from the Board of the Vienna Jewish Community. The Central Israelite Consistory of Belgium, in 2014, also stated that he has no right to bear the title "Rabbi" in Belgium.

In 2006, Friedman participated in the International Conference to Review the Global Vision of the Holocaust, stating: "I am not a denier of the Holocaust, but I think it is legitimate to cast doubt on some statistics." He said that the figure of 6 million deaths during the Holocaust was from a prophecy made before World War II, and that the actual figure was closer to one million.

Friedman's children were expelled from the Talmud Torah school in Austria, where the family lived. He said it was because of his participation in the Holocaust conference; the school said its fees were not paid. After being banned from the Jewish community in Austria in 2007, he moved to New York City.

In 2011, his family moved to Antwerp. Because no schools would admit his children, he sued, and in 2012, the court ordered a Jewish school for girls to admit his two sons, or face heavy fines. In February 2013, the Court of Appeals reversed the trial court.

See also 
Holocaust denial

References 

1972 births
21st-century Belgian Jews
Living people
Orthodox Jewish anti-Zionism
Holocaust denial in Austria
Austrian Orthodox Jews
American Orthodox Jews
Belgian Orthodox Jews
American emigrants to Austria
American emigrants to Belgium
People from Williamsburg, Brooklyn
Rabbis from Vienna
Clergy from Antwerp
Haredi anti-Zionism
Hasidic anti-Zionism
Holocaust denial in Belgium